Saleri may refer to:

Salleri, Bheri
Salleri, Panchthar
Salleri, Solukhumbu
Salleri, Okhaldhunga